Scott Turner (July 31, 1880 – July 30, 1972) was an American mining engineer, director of the United States Bureau of Mines, and 18th recipient of the Hoover Medal.

Early life
Turner was born in 1880 in Lansing, Michigan, son of James Munroe Turner and Sophie (Scott) Turner. His father owned a 1,200 acre Springdale Farm in Lansing, a property known for its prize beef at the time. His grandfather James Madison Turner built the Turner-Dodge House in Lansing. He obtained his Bachelor of Arts in geology from the University of Michigan in 1902, and his EM from the Michigan College of Mines, now Michigan Technological University, in 1904.

Career
Turner started his career as mining engineer, developing mineral deposits in Alaska, Panama, Canada and 14 other countries. For a time he managed the Arctic Coal Company in Spitsbergen (now Svalbard).

In World War I he served in the U.S. Navy, and in 1915 he survived the sinking of the RMS Lusitania. He was on the Lusitania to assess a coal discovery in Spitsbergen, Norway.

From 1926 to 1934 he was director of the U.S. Bureau of Mines. He resigned in July 1934, but did not leave office until August 16, 1934.

In 1932, he served as president of the American Institute of Mining, Metallurgical, and Petroleum Engineers (AIME).

Personal
Turner married Amy Prudden Jenison in 1919. She died on February 6, 1972.

Turner sold Springdale Farm to the city of Lansing after World War II. From a portion of the property, the city built Arboretum Park in its place in the 1950s.

Death
Turner died on July 30, 1972 in Greenwich, Connecticut. He was buried in Mount Hope Cemetery in Lansing.

References

External links 

 Scott Turner Collection, 1838-1972

1880 births
1972 deaths
20th-century American engineers
American mining engineers
Engineers from Michigan
People from Lansing, Michigan
RMS Lusitania
Michigan Technological University alumni
United States Bureau of Mines personnel
United States Navy personnel of World War I
University of Michigan College of Literature, Science, and the Arts alumni